The 1963 World Table Tennis Championships mixed doubles was the 27th edition of the mixed doubles championship. 

Koji Kimura and Kazuko Ito-Yamaizumi defeated Keiichi Miki and Masako Seki in the final by three sets to nil.

Results

See also
List of World Table Tennis Championships medalists

References

-